"Sexy Love" (Korean: 섹시러브 ) is a single by South Korean girl group T-ara and the lead single from their seventh mini-album "Mirage". It was released by Core Contents Media on September 3, 2012. This is the first Korean single released by T-ara without its former member Hwayoung.

The song was released in Japan and served as the first single from the group's second Japanese album Treasure Box.

Background and release

Korean version 
In mid-July 2012, T-ara's agency, Core Contents Media, stated that after "Day by Day" promotional schedule was over, a follow-up single would be released on August 15, " Arranged by "Shinshadong Tiger". On an episode of T-ara's "Star Life Theater" broadcast by KBS on July 17,the picture of T-ara's recording was revealed with former member Hwayoung also participated in the recording. However, due to the influence of  Hwayoung's removal from the group, it was not until August 30, 2012, that the official album cover and concept photos of the seventh mini-album "Mirage" were released. The music video trailer for the single "Sexy Love" was also announced on the same day.

On September 6, 2012, T-ara performed a comeback performance of "Sexy Love" and "Day and Night" on the live music program "M! Countdown", and officially launched the promotion schedule.

Japanese version 
On September 14, 2012, T-ara released the Japanese version of "Sexy Love" as their fifth single in the country. All songs were later re-released under the group's second full album Treasure Box.

The single was released in three versions: Limited Editions A and B with a DVD, and a regular edition. Each edition included a Japanese remake of a previously released song. Regular editions A & B come with DVDs containing music videos and other content.

Track listing

CD

DVD

Chart performance 
The single peaked in the top five on both the Korean and Japanese charts. The Japanese version peaked at number 4 on Oricon singles chart and charted for a total of 10 weeks.

Charts

Korean version

Japanese version

Sales

Release history

References 

T-ara songs
Japanese-language songs
Songs written by Shinsadong Tiger
2012 songs